"The Part Played by Labour in the Transition from Ape to Man" (German: "Anteil der Arbeit an der Menschwerdung des Affen") is an unfinished essay written by Friedrich Engels in the spring of 1876. The essay forms the ninth chapter of Dialectics of Nature, which proposes a unitary materialist paradigm of natural and human history.

Description
Though incomplete, the essay elucidates two aspects of materialist theory which had underpinned Marx and Engels’s thinking since the mid-1840s. First, it argues that humanity’s separation from nature is not inherent to the human condition, but rather that humanity is a part of nature; furthermore, human agency in physically reorganizing nature is part of a long historical process, whereby the physical material of nature is incorporated into human systems of value through labour. Engels uses this framework to suggest that humanity must transcend the ecologically destructive patterns of capitalism, and progress to a mode of production that operates in harmony with nature. 

Secondly, the essay confronts the question of cognition and ontology, suggesting that the human brain is not inherently distinct from the brains of other mammals, but that human intellectual capabilities developed through a dialectical relationship with the human body. Specifically, Engels emphasizes the importance of humans’ opposable thumbs and phonetically dynamic mouths, which enabled them to articulate complex forms of language over time. In that respect, the essay challenged the prevailing philosophy of Cartesian dualism, which drew a stark division between mind and body. 

Marx and Engels had both alluded to this notion in previous writings, for instance in their first collaborative work, The Holy Family, in which they wrote, "Body, being, substance are but different terms for the same reality. It is impossible to separate thought from matter that thinks." However, in describing this dynamic as a function of the historical process of evolution, the essay is among the most explicit and comprehensive documents on the ontology of Marx and Engels.

Summary  

Engels begins by stating that labour is not only the fundamental source of wealth and value, but that it represents the “basic condition for all human existence,” in the sense that the human mind and body have been produced by the historical process of labour. 
He suggests that “labour begins with the making of tools,” and therefore the first essential moment in this history was the development of bipedalism, which freed the hominids’ hands to become more dexterous and capable of crafting rudimentary implements. Thus he emphasizes that “the hand is not only the organ of labour, it is also the product of labour.” Because of the evolution of the hand, the whole body benefited.

As subsistence moved beyond basic foraging, so too did hominids' methods of collaboration and need for mutual support. “In short,” wrote Engels, “men in the making arrived at a point where they had something to say to each other. … The undeveloped larynx of the ape was slowly but surely transformed…and the organs of the mouth gradually learned to produce one articulate sound after another.” 

Concomitantly, the hominids underwent a process of adaptation encompassing a change in their diets that allowed them to inhabit new environments. Fishing and hunting with the assistance of crafted tools were an essential part of this process, because, although often time-consuming, they provided a rich source of protein that helped nourish their bodies and their physical brains. 

Engels suggests that the subsequent major developments following from the development of the meat diet were the control of fire, and the domestication of animals. Then, finally, they reach a point at which they are capable of developing the institutions associated with human civilization: “Agriculture was added to hunting and cattle raising; then came spinning, weaving, metalworking, pottery, and navigation. Along with trade and industry, art and science finally appeared. Tribes developed into nations and states.” 

Engels asserts that humans have thus become distinguished from animals by their ability to manipulate nature in manifold and dynamic ways, as opposed to fitting into a singular ecological niche. He notes that “whole continents” have been reconfigured through human industry, and that even plants and animals themselves have been transformed by selective breeding to the extent “that they become unrecognizable.” 

However, he cautions against the conceptualization of nature as standing in opposition to humanity in any sense, writing, “Let us not flatter ourselves overmuch on account of our human victories over nature. For each such victory nature takes its revenge on us.” He notes the desertification provoked by deforestation in Asia Minor and Greece, and that in many places in Europe the monocrop cultivation of the potato may have led to the proliferation of scrofula, as well as the Great Famine of Ireland. “Thus at every step we are reminded that we by no means rule over nature like a conqueror over a foreign people, like someone standing outside nature – but that we, with flesh, blood and brain, belong to nature, and exist in its midst, and that all our mastery of it consists in the fact that we have the advantage over all other creatures of being able to learn its laws and apply them correctly.”

Relevance to Marxist thought 

The conceptual unity of humanity and nature had been a central theme in Marx and Engels’s thought from the early stages of their careers, and was especially prevalent in their discourses on species-being. For instance, in the Economic and Philosophical Manuscripts of 1844, Marx had written, “Man lives from nature, i.e., nature is his body, and he must maintain a continuing dialogue with it if he is not to die. To say that man’s physical and mental life is linked to nature simply means that nature is linked to itself, for man is a part of nature.” 

However, prior to the publication of Darwin’s Origin of Species in 1859 Marx and Engels still lacked a biological grounding for their theory of dialectical materialism. Writing in the Grundrisse in 1858 or shortly before, Marx alluded to the need for a coherent conceptualization of humanity’s relationship with the earth: “It is not the unity of living and active humanity with the natural, inorganic conditions of their metabolic exchange with nature, and hence their appropriation of nature, which requires explanation or is the result of a historic process, but rather the separation between these inorganic conditions of human existence and this active existence, a separation which is completely posited only in the relation of wage labour and capital.”

In his attempt to furnish such an explanation, Engels implies that it was the complex thought engendered by manual labour and verbal language that spurred the development of our brains. In a biological sense, humans are not fundamentally different from other mammals, in that most mammals are only physically – and not cognitively – incapable of speech: “The dog and the horse, by association with man, have developed such a good ear for articulate speech that they easily learn to understand any language within their range of concept. Moreover they have acquired the capacity for feelings such as affection for man, gratitude, etc., which were previously foreign to them. Anyone who has had much to do with such animals will hardly be able to escape the conviction that in many cases they now feel their inability to speak as a defect, although, unfortunately, it is one that can no longer be remedied because their vocal organs are too specialized in a definite direction.” He goes on to suggest that parrots can, to a limited extent, comprehend human language – a hypothesis that has been substantiated by scientific studies.

The process of cognitive development described by Engels is today known as gene-culture coevolution or the dual inheritance theory, and is widely accepted among biologists. Stephen Jay Gould has argued that this is the only scientifically sound theory of the evolution of the human brain, and stated that Engels’ essay made “the best nineteenth-century case for gene-culture coevolution.”

See also
The Origin of the Family, Private Property and the State
Dialectics of Nature
Dialectical materialism
Metabolic rift
Inheritance of acquired characteristics

References

External links
 Full text online
 A Soviet study pamphlet

1876 non-fiction books
1876 essays
Marxist books
Human evolution books